Harry Walter Swayne (3 March 1869 – 25 November 1911) played first-class cricket for Somerset in 1894. He was born in Glastonbury, Somerset and he died at Mairwa in India.

References

1869 births
1911 deaths
English cricketers
Somerset cricketers
People from Glastonbury